Gustav Adolph Haury Jr. (July 31, 1895 – September 2, 1952) was an American football coach. He was the head football coach at the Bethel College in North Newton, Kansas, serving for six seasons, from 1922 to 1927, and compiling a record of 5–30.

Head coaching record

References

External links
 

1895 births
1952 deaths
Bethel Threshers football coaches
People from Newton, Kansas